This is a list of properties and districts in Hancock County, Georgia that are listed on the National Register of Historic Places (NRHP).

Current listings

|}

References

Hancock
Buildings and structures in Hancock County, Georgia